Permotipulidae is an extinct family of insects within the order Protodiptera. Permotipulidae appeared in the Permian. Two genera are Permotipula and Permila which are close relatives to flies.

References 

The Paleobiology Database
Fossil Diptera Catalog
 David Grimaldi, Michael S. Engel. Evolution of the insects
V.A Blagoderov, E.D. Lukashevich, M.B. Mostovski. 2.2.1.3.4.4. Order Diptera Linné, 1758. The true flies (= Muscida Laicharting, 1781). Sitio web del Laboratorio de Artrópodos, Instituto Paleontológico, Academia Rusa de Ciencias, Moscú

Permian insects
Prehistoric insect families
Protodiptera